Ravindra Laxman Mankani (born 21 May 1956) is an Indian actor who is noted for his work in soap operas, plays and films. He first became a civil engineer and then shifted to acting. He is currently playing the lead role of Dadasaheb in Zee Yuva show BaapManus.

He is a two-time Maharashtra State Award winner for best acting for his work in Varsa Lakshmicha and Limited Manuski. He has worked directors such as Jayoo & Nachiket Patwardhan, Gajanan Jahgirdar, Vijaya Mehta, Mahesh Manjrekar, Raj Kumar Santoshi, Shahab Shamsi, Gajendra Ahere and Mohan Gokhale. Some of his noted serial roles are Shrimant Madhavrao Peshwe in Swami, Thakur Harisingh in Trikaal, Siddharth Singhania in Shanti, and Shrirang Deshmukh in Jhale Mokale Akash.

Some of his Marathi TV serials are Swami, Ashwamedha, Soudamini, Zale Mokale Aakash, Athiti, Kamala (Pimpalpaan), Avantika, Sonpavale, Pankhanchi Savali and Hindi serials are Terah Panne, Shrikant, Tiger, Trikaal, Shanti, CID: Special Bureau and Khaki. Some of his notable dramas are Aakrosh, Aparsh Amrutacha, Reshim Dhage, Buland, Mahant, Hee Shrinchi Ichha and films are Nagin, Smritichitre, Nivdung, Warsa Laxmicha, Limited Manuski, Band Zarokhe, Not only Mrs. Raut and Khandobachya Navane.

His awards include 22 June 1897 and Limited Manuski (Marathi – Limited humanity) directed by Nachiket and Jayoo Patwardhan and Varsa Lakshmicha.

Sources 
 Chakpak
 Aarewah

Male actors from Maharashtra
1956 births
Living people
Indian civil engineers